Debidwar is an upazila of Comilla District in the Division of Comilla, Bangladesh.

Geography
It has 55,619 households and a total area of 238.36 km2.

Demographics

According to the 2011 Census of Bangladesh, Debidwar upazila had a population of 431,352 living in 82,695 households. It's growth rate over the decade 2001-2011 was 13.99%. Burichang has a sex ratio of 1112 females per 1000 males and a literacy rate of 52.83%. 61,418 (14.24%) live in urban areas.

Administration
Debidwar Upazila is divided into Debidwar Municipality and 15 union parishads: Barkamta, Boroshalghor, Dakshin Gunaighor, Dhamti, Elahabad, Fatehabad, Jafargonj, Mohanpur, Rajameher, Rasulpur, Subil, Sultanpur, Uttar Gunaighor, Vani, and Yousufpur. The union parishads are subdivided into 129 mauzas and 192 villages.

Debidwar Municipality is subdivided into 9 wards and 22 mahallas.

Education

 Gov't Sujat Ali College
 মহেশপুর পশ্চিমপাড়া ইসলামিয়া দাখিল মাদ্রাসা   
 Nabiyabad High School/নবিয়াবাদ উচ্চ বিদ্যালয়
 Moheshpur Islamia Dhakhil Madrasah
 Charbakar High School
 Mashikara High School
 Reaz Uddin Pilot Government Model High School. EST. 1918 school
 Abdullah pur high school. 
 Bakasher high school
 Kurchap High School
 Marichakand Addwisha High School
 Oxford International School & College
 Moitri International School
 Jobeda Khatun Women's College
 Nabarun Biddya Niketon
 Boro shalghar Adarsha College
 Mofiz Uddin Girls High School
 Hilful Fuzul Adorsho School
 Alhaz Ajgor Ali Munshi Girls High School
 Dhampti Habibur Rahman High School
 Gongamondal Raj Institution
 Dhampti islamia alia madrasha, azim uddin per sab
 Khalil Pur High School
Khalilpur Govt.Primary School 
Nurpur Govt.Primary School 
 Laxmi pur High School
 Merit Home International School
 Rising Sun Kinder School 
 Chandpur Model Technical High School
 Barashalghar Union M.Ahmed High School
 Chotona Model High School
 Banguri High School
 Noor Pur M Ali And A Bari High School
 দেবিদ্বার আলহাজ্ব আজগর আলী মুন্সী বালিকা উচ্চ বিদ্যালয়
 laxmipur hafezia madrasha
 Moheshpur High School
 Bakri Kandi Adarsha high School
 Barkamta Nolini Shikha Niketon
 Bara Alam Pur Model Junior School
 Ballavpur High School
 Cambridge International School
 Debidwar International Cadet School
 Sayedpur Kamil Madrasha
 Sultanpur Senior Fazil (Degree) Madrasha
 চন্দ্রনগর দাখিল মাদ্রাসা
 চরবাকর ডি,এস,আই আলিম মাদ্রাসা
 Debidwar Islamia Fazil Madrasha
 Podua Islamia Alim Madrasha
Fultali Village High school
Elahabad High School
Elahabad Pro.Muzaffer Ahmmed College
এলাহাবাদ দাখিল মাদ্রাসা
Elahabad Hazera Khaton Model Academy
Elahabad J. Alam Intarnational School
Mohanpor High School
Mohanpor College
Mohammadpor High School
Mohammadpor Serajul Hoq College
Burir par High School
 Rajamehar High Scholl
 Rajamehar Engineering Manzjurol Ahsan Munshi Adarsha College
 Barkamta Al Nur Kindergarten
 Ashora Nurul Islam International School
 Ashora Govt Primary School
 Premu Govt Primary School
 Brahmankhara Govt. Primary School
 Brahmankhara Hafizia Madrasha and Atimkhana
 Bagmara Dakhil Madrasha
 Barkamta Govt. Primary School
 Falgunda Govt. Primary School

See also
Upazilas of Bangladesh
Districts of Bangladesh
Divisions of Bangladesh

References

External links
 http://debidwar.comilla.gov.bd/site/page/122cba54-2144-11e7-8f57-286ed488c766/%E0%A6%8F%E0%A6%95%20%E0%A6%A8%E0%A6%9C%E0%A6%B0%E0%A7%87%20%E0%A6%A6%E0%A7%87%E0%A6%AC%E0%A6%BF%E0%A6%A6%E0%A7%8D%E0%A6%AC%E0%A6%BE%E0%A6%B0
www.debidwar.com

 
Upazilas of Comilla District